Krasnoarmeysky is a rural locality (a khutor) in Kumylzhenskoye Rural Settlement, Kumylzhensky District, Volgograd Oblast, Russia. The population was 291 as of 2010. There are 8 streets.

Geography 
Krasnoarmeysky is located in forest steppe, on Khopyorsko-Buzulukskaya Plain, on the bank of the Stary Khopyor River, 24 km northwest of Kumylzhenskaya (the district's administrative centre) by road. Kuchurovsky is the nearest rural locality.

References 

Rural localities in Kumylzhensky District